Atef Hamdan (born 1992) is a Lebanese multi-code international rugby league footballer who plays as a prop for Wolves in the Lebanon Rugby League Championship, Beirut Phoenicians in the Lebanon Rugby Union Championship, and the Lebanon national team at international level.

Biography

Club career 
Hamdan played rugby league at college level for the Lebanese American University (LAU), before playing for Immortals – the LAU's team in the Lebanon Rugby League Championship – between 2011–12 and 2017–18. In 2018, he played at college level for Beirut Arab University (BAU) and rugby union for Beirut Phoenicians. Hamdan helped Wolves lift the 2021 Rugby League Championship title after beating Grey Wolves in the final on 21 October 2021.

Representative career 
Having played for Lebanon Espoirs internationally in 2012, Hamdan was initially called up to represent the Lebanon national team at the 2021 Rugby League World Cup as one of only two local players in the squad, but withdrew and was replaced by Robin Hachache. In 2022, he took part in various friendly games in preparation for the upcoming West Asia Rugby Championship, playing against Syria and the French UNIFIL forces.

Personal life 
Hamdan graduated from the Lebanese American University in 2014.

References

External links
 Profile at Rugby League Project

1992 births
Living people
Lebanese rugby league players
Lebanese rugby union players
Rugby league props
Lebanon national rugby league team players
Lebanese American University alumni